The term Montenegrin Church may refer to:

 Montenegrin Orthodox Church (1993), a non-canonical eastern-orthodox church in Montenegro, created in 1993
 Montenegrin Orthodox Church (2018), another non-canonical eastern-orthodox church in Montenegro, created in 2018
 Serbian Orthodox Church in Montenegro, canonical branch of the Serbian Orthodox Church in Montenegro
 Catholic Church in Montenegro, incorporates institutions and communities of the Catholic Church in Montenegro

See also 
 Montenegrin Orthodox Church (disambiguation)
 Serbian Orthodox Church (disambiguation)
 Serbian Church (disambiguation)